The 2017 Angola Handball Super Cup (11th edition) was contested by Primeiro de Agosto, as the 2016 league champion and Interclube, the 2016 cup winner. Interclube won its 5th title.

The 2017 Women's Super Cup (11th edition) was contested by Primeiro de Agosto, the 2016 women's league champion and Petro de Luanda, the 2016 cup winner. Petro Atlético was the winner, making it is's 9th title.

 Stats

See also
 2017 Angola Women's Handball League
 2017 Supertaça de Angola (football)
 2017 Supertaça de Angola (basketball)

References

Handball competitions in Angola
2007 establishments in Angola